A Division or A-Division or Division A or variant has the following meanings:
A Division (New York City Subway)
Moldovan "A" Division, football (soccer)
Tuvalu A-Division, football (soccer)
Martyr's Memorial A-Division League, football (soccer)

See also
 B Division (disambiguation)
 Division 1